Viktor Kuznetsov may refer to:
 Viktor Kuznetsov (footballer) (born 1949), Soviet international footballer
 Viktor Kuznetsov (swimmer) (born 1961), Russian swimmer
Viktor Kuznetsov (wrestling coach) (born 1941), Russian wrestling coach
 Viktor Kuznetsov (speedway rider), speedway rider from the Soviet Union

See also
 Viktor Kuznyetsov (born 1986), Ukrainian long jumper and triple jumper